NGC 5334 is a face-on spiral galaxy in the constellation Virgo. It is a member of the Virgo III Groups, a series of galaxies and galaxy clusters strung out to the east of the Virgo Supercluster of galaxies.

References

External links
NASA/IPAC  Extragalactic Database: Pictures and description

Barred spiral galaxies
Virgo (constellation)
5334
49308
08790